Topliceni is a commune in Buzău County, Muntenia, Romania. It is composed of seven villages: Băbeni, Ceairu, Dedulești, Gura Făgetului, Poșta, Răducești and Topliceni.

Notes

Communes in Buzău County
Localities in Muntenia